Toltec Butte is a truncated peak east of Harris Valley in the Shipton Ridge of the Allan Hills, Oates Land. Reconnoitered by the New Zealand Antarctic Research Program (NZARP) Allan Hills Expedition (1964) who named the feature for its resemblance to buildings of the civilization of the same name.

Buttes of Antarctica
Landforms of Oates Land